Slatiňany is a town in Chrudim District in the Pardubice Region of the Czech Republic. It has about 4,100 inhabitants.

Administrative parts
Villages of Kochánovice, Kunčí, Škrovád and Trpišov are administrative parts of Slatiňany.

Geography
The eastern part of the municipal territory with the town proper lies in the Svitavy Uplands, the western part lies in the Iron Mountains. The Chrudimka River flows through the town.

History
The first written mention of Slatiňany is from 1294. A wooden Gothic fortress on a promontory above the Chrudimka was documented in 1371. In the 19th century, during the rule of the noble Auersperg family, the village of Slatiňany economically developed. In the late 19th and early 20th centuries, it became an industrial centre with sugar factory, distillery and fertilizer factory. In 1971, it was promoted to a town.

Demographics

Sights
The main sight is the Slatiňany Castle with a  large English park.

Notable people
Helena Vondráčková (born 1947), singer; raised here

Twin towns – sister cities

Slatiňany is twinned with:
 Likavka, Slovakia
 Rorbas, Switzerland

References

External links

Populated places in Chrudim District
Cities and towns in the Czech Republic